Mountain Mike's Pizza is a chain of pizzerias mainly along the West Coast of the United States, primarily in Northern California. They have additional locations in Arizona, Nevada, Oregon, Utah, and Idaho. The restaurants offer other items, such as chicken wings, garlic sticks, dessert pizzas, as well as a lunch buffet and salad bar.

They also have locations in Southern California, including  Inland Empire and Orange County and two locations in San Diego.

External links
 

Companies based in Hayward, California
Pizza chains of the United States
Regional restaurant chains in the United States
Restaurants established in 1978
Restaurants in the San Francisco Bay Area
1978 establishments in California